Bożawola - is a Polish coat of arms. It was used by several szlachta families.

History

Blazon

Notable bearers
Notable bearers of this coat of arms include:
 Wojciech Górski - first bishop of Kielce
 Franciszek Górski - general
 Ludwik Górski - astronomer
 Stanisław Mackiewicz - publicist
 Józef Mackiewicz - writer

See also
 Polish heraldry
 Heraldic family
 List of Polish nobility coats of arms

Bibliography
 Tadeusz Gajl: Herbarz polski od średniowiecza do XX wieku : ponad 4500 herbów szlacheckich 37 tysięcy nazwisk 55 tysięcy rodów. L&L, 2007. .

External links
 http://gajl.wielcy.pl/herby_nazwiska.php?lang=pl&herb=boza-wola
 http://pl.wikisource.org/wiki/Bo%C5%BCa_Wola

Polish coats of arms